Paul Henreid (January 10, 1908 – March 29, 1992) was an Austrian actor, director, producer, and writer. He is best remembered for two film roles; Victor Laszlo in Casablanca and Jerry Durrance in Now, Voyager, both released between 1942 and 1943.

Early life
Born Paul Georg Julius Hernreid in the city of Trieste, then part of the Austro-Hungarian Empire, Henreid was the son of Maria-Luise (Lendecke) and Karl Alphons Hernreid, a Viennese banker, born as Carl Hirsch, who had converted in 1904 from Judaism to Catholicism, due to anti-semitism. Henreid's father died in April 1916, and the family fortune had dwindled by the time he graduated from the exclusive Theresianische Akademie.

Stage and film careers
Henreid trained for the theatre in Vienna, over his family's objections, and debuted there on the stage under the direction of Max Reinhardt. He began his film career acting in German and Austrian films in the 1930s. During that period, he was strongly anti-Nazi, so much so that he was later designated an "official enemy of the Third Reich" and all his assets were seized.
In 1934 Henreid tried to become a member of the NS-Reichsfilmkammer (National Sozialistic Reich Film Chamber). He was declined, after the NS-Regime found out that he was a half jew. In 1937 he tried again to get a member by a special permit. This request was personally rejected by Joseph Goebbels.

Career in the United Kingdom
In 1937 Henreid played Prince Albert in the first British stage production of Victoria Regina.  With the outbreak of the Second World War in 1939, Henreid risked deportation or internment as an enemy alien, but Conrad Veidt (who later appeared as Major Heinrich Strasser in the film Casablanca) spoke for him, and he was allowed to remain and work in British films. Veidt himself was an avowed anti-Nazi, with a Jewish wife. Thanks to such support, Henreid was able to continue his work in British films. In 1939 he had a notable supporting role as Staefel in Goodbye, Mr. Chips and the next year third billing as a German espionage agent in the thriller Night Train to Munich. In 1940 he also performed in a minor role in the British musical comedy spy film Under Your Hat.

RKO, Warner Bros., and MGM
After relocating to the United States and having a successful run on Broadway in Flight to the West, Henreid was put under contract by RKO in 1941. The studio changed his name by dropping the nobiliary particle "von", as simply "Henreid" would sound less overtly Germanic. That year, Henreid became a citizen of the United States. His first film for the studio was Joan of Paris, released in 1942, that became a big hit.

Moving to Warner Bros. in 1942, Henreid was cast in Now, Voyager, playing the romantic lead opposite Bette Davis. His next role was as Victor Laszlo, a heroic anti-German resistance leader on the run, in Casablanca (1942) with Humphrey Bogart and Ingrid Bergman. Warners then tried to consolidate Henreid's new status by co-starring him with Ida Lupino in a romantic drama, In Our Time (1944) then putting him in Between Two Worlds (1944), a remake of Outward Bound. The Conspirators (1944) was an attempt to repeat the success of Casablanca with Henreid fighting Nazis in an ostensible neutral city with a supporting cast that included Sydney Greenstreet and Peter Lorre. Henreid turned down the male lead alongside Bette Davis, in Watch on the Rhine (which went to Paul Lukas) and Mr Skeffington (which went to Claude Rains).

Henreid returned briefly to RKO to play a pirate swashbuckler in the studio's 1945 release The Spanish Main. Returning to Warner Bros., he was cast the following year in Devotion, a biopic of the Brontë family in which Henreid portrays Arthur Bell Nicholls. He was next cast opposite Eleanor Parker in an adaptation of Of Human Bondage (1946). Metro-Goldwyn-Mayer then borrowed Henreid from Warners to play Robert Schumann in Song of Love (1947) opposite Katharine Hepburn. Henreid wrote in his memoirs that he bought out his Warner Bros contract for $75,000 and was offered a long term contract at MGM for $150,000 a year but turned it down.

Blacklisting and brief return to European films
In his 1984 autobiography Ladies Man Henreid recounts that he was one of a group of Hollywood stars who went to Washington to protest against the excesses of the House Committee on Un-American Activities, following which he was semi-blacklisted.  He says he was blacklisted from the major studios for five years – apart from Rope of Sand which was directed by a friend – before the blacklist was lifted, and he never understood why.

After leaving Warner Bros., Henreid decided to turn producer, making the film noir Hollow Triumph (1948) in which he also appeared. He was a villain in a Burt Lancaster adventure film Rope of Sand (1949). In 1950 he made a low-budget film for Edward and Harry Danziger, So Young, So Bad, which was followed by an offer from Sam Katzman to play pirate Jean Lafitte in Last of the Buccaneers (1950). He then went to France for Pardon My French (1951) before returning to Katzman for Thief of Damascus (1951). He directed and played the lead role in For Men Only (1952). Later, in England, he made the movies in the film noir genre Stolen Face (1952) and Mantrap (1953), then went back to Katzman for Siren of Bagdad (1953). In 1954, once again working for MGM, Henreid performed in a minor role in Deep in My Heart, his first "A" film in several years. 
He moved next to Columbia Pictures, where he appeared in Pirates of Tripoli for Katzman; and then, yet again, to MGM for a part in Meet Me in Las Vegas. He also appeared at this time on Broadway in Festival.

Directing and final performances
In the early 1950s, Henreid began directing both film and television productions. His "small-screen" directorial credits include episodes of Alfred Hitchcock Presents, Maverick, Bonanza, The Virginian, and The Big Valley. He also directed on the "big screen" A Woman's Devotion (1956) in which he played a supporting role, Girls on the Loose (1958), and Live Fast, Die Young (1958). In 1964, he directed Dead Ringer, which stars Bette Davis and features in a minor role Henreid's daughter Monika.

While working as a director, Henreid continued to accept some small parts as well in Ten Thousand Bedrooms (1957), Holiday for Lovers (1959), Never So Few (1959), and Four Horsemen of the Apocalypse (1962). Additional film appearances include Operation Crossbow (1965), The Madwoman of Chaillot (1969), and The Failing of Raymond (1971). In 1973, prior to his last screen appearance in Exorcist II: The Heretic (1977), Henreid returned to Broadway to perform in Don Juan in Hell.

Personal life and legacy

Henreid married Elizabeth Camilla Julia "Lisl" Glück (1908–1993) in 1936; the couple adopted two daughters. In 1992, at age 84, Henreid died of pneumonia in Santa Monica, California after suffering a stroke. He was buried in nearby Woodlawn Cemetery.

In Los Angeles, California in 1960, to honor Henreid's significant contributions to the entertainment industry as both an actor and director, two stars were dedicated to him and installed on the Hollywood Walk of Fame. One of those stars, which recognizes his career in film, is located at 6366 Hollywood Boulevard; the other, for television, is at 1720 Vine Street.

Complete filmography

As actor

Morgenrot (1933)
Baroud (1933) as uncredited minor role
Love in Morocco (1933) as uncredited minor role
Hohe Schule, aka The Secret of Cavelli (1934) as Franz von Ketterer
Eva, the Factory Girl (1935) as Fritz
...nur ein Komödiant (1935) as Velthen
Victoria the Great (1937) as uncredited minor role
Goodbye, Mr. Chips (1939) as Staefel
Mad Men of Europe (1940) as Victor Brandt 
Night Train to Munich (1940) as Capt. Karl Marsen
Under Your Hat (1940) as uncredited minor role 
Joan of Paris (1942) as Paul Lavallier
Now, Voyager (1942) as Jerry Durrance
Casablanca (1942) as Victor Laszlo
In Our Time (1944) as Count Stefan Orwid
Between Two Worlds (1944) as Henry Bergner
The Conspirators (1944) as Vincent Van Der Lyn
The Spanish Main (1945) as Capt. Laurent Van Horn
Devotion (1946) as Rev. Arthur Nicholls
Of Human Bondage (1946) as Philip Carey
Deception (1946) as Karel Novak
Song of Love (1947) as Robert Schumann
Hollow Triumph, aka The Scar (1948) as John Muller / Dr. Bartok
Rope of Sand (1949) as Commandant Paul Vogel
So Young So Bad (1950) as Dr. John H. Jason
Last of the Buccaneers (1950) as Jean Lafitte
Pardon My French (1951) – Paul Rencourt
For Men Only (1952) as Dr. Stephen Brice
Thief of Damascus (1952) as General Abu Amdar
Stolen Face (1952) as Dr. Philip Ritter
Dans la vie tout s'arrange (1952) as Paul Rencourt
Mantrap, aka Woman in Hiding (1953) as Hugo Bishop
Siren of Bagdad (1953) as Kazah the Great
 Cabaret (1954) as Konrad Hegner
Deep in My Heart (1954) as Florenz Ziegfeld
Pirates of Tripoli (1955) as Edri al-Gadrian
Meet Me in Las Vegas (1956) as Pierre
A Woman's Devotion (1956) as Capt. Henrique Monteros
Ten Thousand Bedrooms (1957) as Anton
Holiday for Lovers (1959) as Eduardo Barroso
Never So Few (1959) as Nikko Regas
Four Horsemen of the Apocalypse (1962) as Etienne Laurier
Operation Crossbow (1965) as Gen. Ziemann
The Madwoman of Chaillot (1969) as The General
The Failing of Raymond (1971, TV Movie) as Dr. Abel
Death Among Friends (1975, TV Movie) as Otto Schiller
Exorcist II: The Heretic (1977) as The Cardinal (final film role)

As himself or narrator
Hollywood Canteen (1944) – himself
Peking Remembered (1967 documentary) – narrator

As producer
Hollow Triumph (1948)
For Men Only (1952)

As director
A Stranger Everywhere (S4/Ep10) (1968)

Film
For Men Only (1952)
A Woman's Devotion (1956)
Live Fast, Die Young (1958)
Girls on the Loose (1958)
Dead Ringer (1964)
Ballad in Blue (1964)

Television
 Maverick "Passage to Fort Doom" (1959) 
The Californians (1957–1959), various episodes
 Alfred Hitchcock Presents TV series episode "The Landlady," "Cell 227," and 26 others (1957–1962)
The June Allyson Show (1960) episode 'The Lie'
The Virginian "Long Ride to Wind River" (1966)
The Big Valley (9 episodes)
(TV Series 1965-1968)

As writer
Ballad in Blue (1964) (story)

Music
Deception (1946) (Hollenius' Cello Concerto, Cello Concerto in D major, uncredited and dubbed by Eleanor Slatkin)
Stolen Face (1952) (song "Rolling Home")

Radio appearances

Notes

References

External links

 
 
 
 
 
 Paul Henreid  (in German) from the online-archive of the Österreichischen Mediathek

1908 births
1992 deaths
20th-century Austrian male actors
Actors from Trieste
American people of Austrian-Jewish descent
Austrian emigrants to the United States
Austrian knights
American Ashkenazi Jews
Austrian male film actors
Austrian male stage actors
Austro-Hungarian Jews
Burials at Woodlawn Memorial Cemetery, Santa Monica
Film people from California
Hollywood blacklist
Deaths from pneumonia in California
Jewish American male actors
Warner Bros. contract players
Austrian expatriates in the United Kingdom